Stainton with Adgarley is a small village in Cumbria, England. It is situated about 5 miles from Dalton-in-Furness. It is a small farming community and is served by the Urswick Bardsea and Stainton Parish Council.

There were once two villages, Stainton and Adgarley. The Stainton name comes from the original Steintun. Adgarley was once called Eadgarlith. Each has its own village green.

It contains a limestone quarry called Stainton Quarry, worked since before 1900.

References

External links
  Cumbria County History Trust: Urswick (nb: provisional research only – see Talk page)

Villages in Cumbria
South Lakeland District